The Battle of Sharur occurred in August 1501. It ended with a decisive victory for the Safavid army. After this victory, the way of the Safavids to Tabriz was opened. Alvand Mirza disappeared from the political scene.

Background 
Ismail defeated Shirvanshah Farrukh Yasar in the Battle of Jabani in 1500 and captured Baku in the spring of 1501. While besieging the Gulustan fortress, he heard the news that AQ Qoyunlu Alvand Mirza had gathered troops and moved to fight him. Although Alvand advised him to stay in Shirvan and became its ruler.

Battle 
Two armies met in the plain of Sharur. Ismail had an army of 7,000 and Alvand Mirza had an army more than 10,000. According to Roger Savory, the number of Alvand's army was 4 times more than the number of Ismail's army. Ismail won by showing great commanding ability. Seeing that his army was disbanded, Alvand Mirza fled to Erzincan.

Ismail also killed in a one-on-one battle with the famous commander of the Aq Qoyunlus, Karachagay khan. Although Ismail was only 14 years old in that battle.

Aftermath 
After victory, Ismail went to Tabriz. After entering Tabriz, he proclaimed himself shah and founded the Safavid Empire. With this battle, Ismail captured Azerbaijan. Thus, he accumulated the rich resources needed to expand his state.

References

Sources
 
 
 

1501 in Asia
Sharur
Sharur
History of Tabriz
16th century in Azerbaijan